Robert Christian Knapp (born September 16, 1953) is an American former professional baseball right-handed pitcher, whose career totals include 122 Major League Baseball (MLB) games pitched, for the Chicago White Sox (–) and California Angels (–). He won 12 and 14 games, respectively, in back-to-back seasons (–).

After graduating from Central Michigan University, Knapp was selected in the first round of the 1975 Major League Baseball draft by the White Sox. In 1977 he appeared in five games for the Triple-A Iowa Oaks, and worked in 27 MLB games for the White Sox, 26 as a starting pitcher, posting a 12–7 record with four complete games. He was traded along with Brian Downing and Dave Frost to the Angels for Bobby Bonds, Richard Dotson and Thad Bosley on December 5, 1977. Knapp then worked in 30 games for the 1978 Angels, 29 as a starter, and posted a 14–8 mark with six complete games.

In 1979 and 1980, however, his effectiveness diminished, as he could win only seven of 23 decisions and his earned run average ballooned to 5.51 and 6.14, respectively. Knapp finished his career in the minors during the  season, going winless in four starts.

During his MLB career, Knapp allowed 642 hits and 250 bases on balls in  innings pitched, with 355 strikeouts and 15 total complete games.

References

External links

Chris Knapp at Baseball Almanac

1953 births
Living people
Appleton Foxes players
Baseball players from North Carolina
California Angels players
Central Michigan Chippewas baseball players
Chicago White Sox players
Iowa Cubs players
Iowa Oaks players
Kinston Blue Jays players
Knoxville Sox players
Major League Baseball pitchers
Salt Lake City Gulls players
Syracuse Chiefs players
People from Cherry Point, North Carolina